Facundo Pons (born 22 November 1995) is an Argentine professional footballer who plays as a forward for Alvarado.

Career
Pons made his senior debut in regional football with Centenario at the age of 16, before signing for fellow Liga Venadense team Atlético Elortondo two years later. In 2016, Pons signed for Juventud Pueyrredon. The club featured in Torneo Federal B in 2017, with Pons netting four goals in fifteen appearances. In 2018, Pons joined Primera B Nacional side Arsenal de Sarandí. He scored his first professional goal on his first start for Arsenal, scoring in a 3–0 win over Mitre on 13 October; which he followed up with further goals against Independiente Rivadavia and Quilmes (2) over the next month.

Career statistics
.

References

External links

1995 births
Living people
People from General López Department
Argentine footballers
Association football forwards
Primera Nacional players
Arsenal de Sarandí footballers
Deportivo Riestra players
Quilmes Atlético Club footballers
Club Atlético Alvarado players
Sportspeople from Santa Fe Province